The futsal competition at the 2018 Summer Youth Olympics was held from 7 to 18 October. At Tecnópolis and the CeNARD, the first one located in Villa Martelli, and the second one in Buenos Aires. There are two tournaments, one for boys and one for girls.

Venues
Tecnópolis – Villa Martelli, Buenos Aires Province
CeNARD – Núñez, Buenos Aires

Qualification
Each National Olympic Committee (NOC) is limited to participation in 1 team sports (Futsal, Beach handball, Field Hockey, and Rugby Sevens) per each gender with the exception of the host country who can enter one team per sport. Also at Futsal each NOC can enter a maximum of 1 team of 10 athletes per both genders. To be eligible to participate in the Youth Olympics, athletes must have been born between 1 January 2000 and 31 December 2003. 

As hosts, Argentina has the right to directly qualify 1 team (male or female of their own choice, but not both) on account of CONMEBOL quota. The best ranked NOC in each of the 6 Continental Qualification Tournaments will obtain quota place. 2 quota per each gender are giving to AFC, UEFA, CONCACAF and CONMEBOL and 1 quota per each gender are giving to CAF and OFC.

If for a particular Confederation there is no qualification Tournament or the tournament is not confirmed by 31 December 2017, the best ranked NOC from the respective Confederation at the 2016 FIFA Futsal World Cup will obtain quota place for the boys tournament and the best ranked NOC from the respective Confederation from a senior Futsal tournament will be obtain quota place for the girls tournament. Should there be no teams remaining from the respective Confederation, the FIFA Ranking of 15 May 2018 will be used to determine the next best ranked NOC not yet qualified that will obtain quota place.

Boys' qualification
Host nation Argentina chose to compete in boys' tournament. In addition, 9 other national under-18 teams qualified from six separate continental confederations.

 Italy originally qualified, but chose to compete in beach handball. The spot was reallocated to the next highest ranked nation, Slovakia.

Girls' qualification
Since host nation Argentina chose to compete in boys' tournament, 10 national under-18 teams qualified from six separate continental confederations.

 New Zealand originally qualified, but chose to compete in rugby sevens. The spot was reallocated to the next highest ranked nation, Tonga.
 Brazil and Colombia originally qualified, but Brazil chose to compete in boys' tournament and Colombia chose to compete in rugby sevens. The spots were eventually reallocated to Bolivia and Chile.
 Nigeria originally qualified, but declined to enter. The spot was eventually reallocated to Cameroon.
 United States and Canada originally qualified, but United States declined to enter and Canada chose to compete in rugby sevens. The spots were eventually reallocated to Trinidad and Tobago and Dominican Republic.
 Iran originally qualified, but chose to compete in boys' tournament. The spot was reallocated to the next highest ranked nation, Thailand.

Schedule
The girls' tournament will take place between 7–17 October 2018, and the boys' tournament will take place between 7–18 October 2018.

All times are local, ART (UTC−3).

Draw

The draw was held on 24 August 2018, 18:30 ART (UTC−3), at the Casa de Gobierno de la Ciudad de Buenos Aires in Buenos Aires. In both the boys' and girls' tournament, the ten teams were drawn into two groups of five teams. The hosts Argentina were assigned to position A1 in the boys' tournament. As teams from the same confederation could not be drawn into the same group, the two teams each from AFC (Asia), CONCACAF (North America), CONMEBOL (South America), and UEFA (Europe) were drawn into different groups, and as a result the two remaining teams, one each from CAF (Africa) and OFC (Oceania), were also drawn into different groups.

Match officials
A total of 24 officials (18 men and 6 women) were appointed by FIFA for the two tournaments.

Squads

Each team had to name a preliminary squad of 20 players (minimum three must be goalkeepers). From the preliminary squad, the team had to name a final squad of 10 players (minimum two must be goalkeepers) by the FIFA deadline.

Format
The top two teams of each group advance to the semi-finals. The rankings of teams in each group are determined as follows (regulations Article 15.5):

If two or more teams are equal on the basis of the above three criteria, their rankings are determined as follows:

In the semi-finals, bronze medal match and goal medal match, if a match is level at the end of normal playing time, extra time will be played (two periods of five minutes each) and followed, if necessary, by a penalty shoot-out to determine the winner.

Boys' tournament

Girls' tournament

Medal summary

Medal table

Medalists

References

External links
Futsal Schedule and Results , Buenos Aires 2018
Youth Olympic Futsal Tournaments Buenos Aires 2018 - Men, FIFA.com
Youth Olympic Futsal Tournaments Buenos Aires 2018 - Women, FIFA.com
Official Results Book – Futsal

 
Futsal
2018
Summer Youth Olympics
Summer Youth Olympics
2018